Major-General Sir Harold Augustus Wernher, 3rd Baronet,  (16 January 1893 – 30 June 1973) was a British military officer.

Life and career
He was the second son of Sir Julius Wernher, 1st Baronet, and his wife, Alice Sedgwick Mankiewicz. He reached the rank of major-general during World War II, and he played an important role in coordinating the logistics of Operation Overlord.

Second World War

In September 1943, Sir Harold was appointed by Prime Minister Winston Churchill as Co-Ordinator of Ministry and Science Facilities (CMSF), in charge of overseeing the construction of all the Mulberry Harbour components.

In 1948, he inherited the Wernher baronetcy from his elder brother, Sir Derrick Wernher (1889–1948), who had no male heir. He had previously inherited Luton Hoo after his father's death in 1912.

He died in 1973 at Luton, Bedfordshire, and as he did not have any surviving male heir, the baronetcy became extinct. To avoid death duties, the Wernher estate donated the Wernher Triptych to the British Museum.

Marriage and children

On 20 July 1917, he married Countess Anastasia de Torby (9 September 1892 – 7 December 1977), the eldest child of Grand Duke Michael Mikhailovich of Russia and his morganatic wife, Sophie of Merenberg, Countess de Torby. They had three children:

Captain George Michael Alexander Wernher (22 August 1918 – 4 December 1942), killed in action during World War II at the age of 24.
Georgina Wernher (17 October 1919 – 28 April 2011), married Lt.-Col. Harold Joseph Phillips (6 November 1909 – 27 October 1980) on 10 October 1944. They had five children, fifteen grandchildren and twelve great-grandchildren. She remarried Lt.-Col. Sir George Kennard, 3rd Bt., in December 1992. 
 Myra Alice Wernher (8 March 1925 – 29 July 2022), married Major Sir David Henry Butter (1920–2010), son of Colonel Charles Adrian James Butter, on 5 November 1946. Lady Butter is a Patroness of the Royal Caledonian Ball.

Arms

References

External links
Generals of World War II

1893 births
1973 deaths
British Army major generals
Baronets in the Baronetage of the United Kingdom
Harold
British Army generals of World War II
Knights Grand Cross of the Royal Victorian Order
English people of German descent
12th Royal Lancers officers
Roehampton Trophy
People from Central Bedfordshire District
King Edward VII's Hospital
English Jews